Serratina is a demonym (synonymous with Serrati)  for these regions:
La Serra d'en Galceran
Serra, Valencia

It's also a genus of bivalve.